Mr. Zero is a song by Yardbirds vocalist Keith Relf. It charted at #50 on the UK Singles Chart.

References

1966 singles
1966 songs
Columbia Records singles
Song recordings produced by Paul Samwell-Smith
Songs written by Bob Lind